Rodney T. Willett is an American politician who has served as a Democratic member of the Virginia House of Delegates since 2020, representing the 73rd district.

Biography
Willett was an attorney and technology consultant for Impact Makers. He is a College of William & Mary alumnus. Willett is also a member of several local organizations, and serves on the Virginia Children’s Health Insurance Program Advisory Committee.

Political career

2019

Willett announced his campaign for the 73rd district after incumbent Democrat Debra Rodman announced her intent to run for the 12th Senate district. In the general election, he faced Republican Mary Margaret Kastelberg, a financial services advisor. Willett was elected with 52.20% of the vote.

References

Living people
Democratic Party members of the Virginia House of Delegates
21st-century American politicians
Year of birth missing (living people)